First United Methodist Church is a historic church at the junction of Main and Market Streets in Searcy, Arkansas, United States.  It is a large single-story brick structure, with a front-facing gable and square tower projecting from the front.  It has English Gothic massing with Late Victorian decorative elements, including buttressing, lancet-arch stained-glass windows, and a main entrance with a stained-glass lancet transom.  The church was built in 1872, and is the only example of English Gothic architecture in White County.

The church was listed on the National Register of Historic Places in 1992.

First United Methodist Church (FUMC) in Searcy, Arkansas ministry focuses on four main areas: Engaging in Ministry with the Poor, Improving Global Health, Developing Principled Christian Leaders and Creating New and Renewed Congregations. Narrowing their focus to these four areas allows churches (Methodist Denomination) to use their resources effectively as they live out God's vision for the church.  The FUMC is a Christian-based worship center with an obligation to bear a faithful Christian witness to Jesus Christ, the living reality at the center of the Church's life and witness. To fulfill this obligation, they reflect critically on biblical and theological inheritance, striving to express faithfully the witness we make in today's time.

See also
National Register of Historic Places listings in White County, Arkansas

References

External links
Official Website

United Methodist churches in Arkansas
Churches on the National Register of Historic Places in Arkansas
Gothic Revival church buildings in Arkansas
Churches completed in 1872
19th-century Methodist church buildings in the United States
Churches in White County, Arkansas
National Register of Historic Places in Searcy, Arkansas
1872 establishments in Arkansas